Nice to Be Around is a 1977 album by Rosemary Clooney.

Track listing 
 "You" (Randy Edelman) – 4:15
 "50 Ways to Leave Your Lover" (Paul Simon) – 4:28
 "Send in the Clowns" (Stephen Sondheim) – 3:47
 "Music" (James Taylor) – 4:40
 "Thank You Baby" (Bruce Johnston) – 4:29
 "All by Myself" (Eric Carmen, Sergei Rachmaninoff) – 5:10
 "My Little Town" (Paul Simon) – 3:55
 "The Hungry Years" (Neil Sedaka, Howard Greenfield) – 4:26 
 "I Won't Last a Day Without You" (Roger Nichols, Paul Williams) – 5:20
 "Nice to Be Around" (Paul Williams, John Williams) – 4:23

Personnel

Performance 
 Rosemary Clooney – vocals
 Frank Ricotti – percussion
 Harold Fisher – drums
 Michael Moran – keyboards
 Laurence Juber – guitar
 Ray Cooper – percussion
 Gordon Beck – keyboards
 Barry De Souza – drums
 Stan Sulzmann – tenor saxophone, flute
 Alan Parker – guitar
 Chas Mills – backing vocals
 Kate Robbins – backing vocals
 Stephanie De Sykes – backing vocals
Del Newman - arrangements
David Katz - conductor
Technical
Richard Dodd - engineer
Alan Warner - executive producer

References 

1977 albums
Rosemary Clooney albums
United Artists Records albums
Albums produced by Del Newman